Frederick Peter Kippax (17 July 1922 – 21 September 1987) was an English amateur footballer who played as a left winger.

Career

Club career
Kippax played in the Football League for Burnley and Liverpool. He later played for Yorkshire Amateur.

During World War Two, Kippax guested for West Ham United, scoring 2 goals in 7 appearances.

International career
Kippax represented Great Britain at the 1948 Summer Olympics.

References

External links
Peter Kippax

1922 births
1987 deaths
Footballers from Burnley
English footballers
Association football wingers
Yorkshire Amateur A.F.C. players
Burnley F.C. players
Liverpool F.C. players
English Football League players
Footballers at the 1948 Summer Olympics
Olympic footballers of Great Britain
English Football League representative players
FA Cup Final players